Harry Sherwin (11 October 1893 – 8 January 1953) was an English professional footballer who played as a wing half for Sunderland.

References

1893 births
1953 deaths
People from Walsall
English footballers
Association football wing halves
Darlaston Town F.C. players
Sunderland A.F.C. players
Leeds United F.C. players
Barnsley F.C. players
English Football League players